Hashtugan (also Romanized as Hashtūgān; also known as Malooghan, Malūghan, Malughau, and Malūqān) is a village in Arabkhaneh Rural District, Shusef District, Nehbandan County, South Khorasan Province, Iran. At the 2006 census, its population was 83, in 20 families.

References 

Populated places in Nehbandan County